The Cathedral of the Theotokos in Vilnius is the episcopal see of the Eastern Orthodox Christian Metropolitan of Vilnius and all Lithuania.

Between 1415 and 1795, it was the mother church of the Ruthenian Orthodox Church and the Ruthenian Uniate Church (following the 1596 Union of Brest) within the Grand Duchy of Lithuania and then the Polish–Lithuanian Commonwealth.

History

14–18th centuries
The cathedral was built during the reign of the Grand Duke of Lithuania Algirdas for his Orthodox second wife Uliana of Tver in 1346. It was constructed by Kievan architects with the blessing of Saint Alexius, Metropolitan of Kiev and all Rus', in 1348.

The Cathedral of the Theotokos is one of the most ancient churches of Vilnius, built before the christianization of Lithuania when the Grand Duchy of Lithuania was the last pagan state in Europe. It became an important spiritual centre for the growing Christian population of the Duchy. In 1495 the marriage between Grand Duke Aleksandras of Lithuania and Helena of Moscow, daughter of Ivan III, was held in the cathedral in the presence of Saint Macarius. It was there that Helena was buried in 1513.

After the conversion of Lithuania to Roman Catholicism, the Orthodox cathedral was protected by princes Konstanty Ostrogski and Konstanty Wasyl Ostrogski, who restored it after the collapse of the dome in 1506. After their deaths, the cathedral was taken over by the Uniate Catholic church in 1609 and was rebuilt in a style typical of the region.

In 1748, the cathedral was abandoned after a major fire and the building was used for various other purposes. It was reconstructed in the Baroque style in 1785. The cathedral was once again destroyed by the Russian army during the Kościuszko Uprising.

19–20th centuries

In 1808, a local prelate sold the neglected building to the Vilnius University, which had the building thoroughly modernised in 1822 in the Neoclassical style by Karol Podczaszyński. After that, the building hosted an anatomical theatre, library and other university facilities for half a century.

The old cathedral was confiscated and transferred to the Russian Orthodox Church on the initiative of count Mikhail Nikolayevich Muravyov and his brother during the Russification campaign. The Russian architect Nikolai Chagin was responsible for its reconstruction from 1865 until 1868 in a style imitating medieval Georgian architecture.
 
St. Tikhon (Belavin), then Archbishop of Vilnius, presided over the cathedral and Orthodox Christians of Lithuania between 1913 and the occupation of Lithuania by the German troops in 1915. Most of the Russian Orthodox clergy left with the retreating Russian army.

The cathedral of the Theotokos was damaged during the Second World War but was restored in 1948, although its renovations were not completed until 1957. Today the cathedral belongs to the Russian Orthodox Church and was once again renovated in 1998. Its services are attended mostly by ethnic Russian and Belarusian residents of Vilnius.

Gallery

See also
 Church of St. Paraskeva, Vilnius
 Orthodox Church of the Holy Spirit, Vilnius

Notes

References

  Вильнюсский Пречистенский кафедральный собор. Официальный сайт собора Успения Пресвятой Богородицы, г. Вильнюс. (Official website.)
  Detailed history of the cathedral

Buildings and structures completed in 1346
Churches in Vilnius
Cathedrals in Lithuania
Fortified church buildings
Russian Orthodox cathedrals in Europe
Eastern Orthodox churches in Lithuania
Neoclassical church buildings in Lithuania